XHLH-FM is a radio station on 98.1 FM in Acaponeta, Nayarit. The station is owned by Alica Medios, the media arm of Grupo Empresarial Alica, and carries a grupera format known as La Patrona 98.1.

History
XHLH began as XELH-AM 1400 (later 670), with a concession awarded to Pedro Aguiar Villegas on August 15, 1967. Aguilar Villegas sold XELH and XETD-AM Tecuala to Alica in the early 2000s.

The station received authorization to move to FM as XHLH-FM 98.1 in 2011.

References

External links
Grupo Empresarial Alica

Radio stations in Nayarit